[[File:Prensa Obrera crimen MF.jpg|thumb|250px|Prensa Obrera'''s front page in the edition of October 21. It says: "A crime against working class"]]
On 20 October 2010, Argentine student and Trotskyism activist Mariano Ferreyra was shot dead in Buenos Aires by members of a railway workers union.

Incident
Mariano Ferreyra (born 3 June 1987 in Sarandí) was an Argentine student who was active in the Workers' Party (Partido Obrero). He was shot dead during a dispute involving railway workers in Buenos Aires. He was shot by supporters of the Peronist Unión Ferroviaria (Railways Union), affiliated to the CGT, in a clash with socialist workers.  Two other people were injured in the shooting. One, Elsa Rodríguez, a mother of three, was seriously injured and was still fighting for her life in hospital a week later. At the time it was alleged that the police stood by. Ferreyra's death led to widespread protests in Argentina.

It was proved that José Pedraza (the leader of the Unión Ferroviaria) had ordered his people to shoot and create incidents. Former President Nestor Kirchner took a personal interest in the case (he protected witnesses in his home) until he died a week later.

In April 2013 Pedraza was condemned to 15 years in prison.

Pedraza, due to his age, was put under home arrest in 2016. He died at his home in December 2018.

See also
Rubén Sobrero

References

"Argentina protests over labour activist killing". BBC News. 22 October 2010.
"Union Member’s Killing Spurs General Strike in Argentina". Latin America Herald Tribune. Retrieved 13 July 2013.
"Judiciary identifies Mariano Ferreyra's murderer". Buenos Aires Herald''. 22 October 2010.
"Mariano Ferreyra, compañero, amigo, hasta la victoria siempre" . Partido Obrero. 21 October 2010.
"A crime against the working class". Coordinating Committee for the Refoundation of the Fourth International. Retrieved 13 July 2013.

External links
16-minute film about Mariano 

1987 births
2010 deaths
Presidency of Cristina Fernández de Kirchner
Deaths by firearm in Argentina
Deaths by person in Argentina
People murdered in Argentina
Protest-related deaths
Trials in Argentina
2010s in Buenos Aires
Crime in Buenos Aires
Labour disputes in Argentina
October 2010 crimes
2010 murders in Argentina